Julia Terziyska (born 5 March 1996) is a Bulgarian tennis player.

Terziyska has a career-high singles ranking of world No. 306, achieved on 15 February 2016. She reached her highest WTA doubles ranking of No. 238 on 5 August 2019. Terziyska has won 12 singles and 15 doubles titles on the ITF Women's Circuit.

Playing in Billie Jean King Cup competitions, she has a win–loss record of 5–3. She made her debut for Bulgaria in 2018.

ITF Circuit finals

Singles: 21 (12 titles, 9 runner–ups)

Doubles: 32 (15 titles, 17 runner–ups)

Fed Cup/Billie Jean King Cup participation
Julia Terziyska debuted for the Bulgaria Fed Cup team in 2018. Since then, she has a 1–2 singles record and a 4–1 doubles record (5–3 overall).

Singles (1–2)

Doubles (4–1)

References

External links
 
 
 

1996 births
Living people
Bulgarian female tennis players
Sportspeople from Sofia